Danny Tenenbaum is an American attorney and politician serving as a member of the Montana House of Representatives from the 95th district. Elected in November 2020, he assumed office on January 4, 2021.

Education 
Tenenbaum earned a Bachelor of Arts degree in history from the University of Wisconsin–Madison and a Juris Doctor from the New York University School of Law.

Career 
After earning his bachelor's degree, Tenenbaum worked as an overseas refugee officer with the Department of Homeland Security. After graduating from law school, he and his wife moved from New York City to Missoula, Montana, where he works as a public defender. Tenenbaum was elected to the Montana House of Representatives in November 2020. He assumed office on January 4, 2021, succeeding Shane Morigeau.

References 

Living people
Year of birth missing (living people)
University of Wisconsin–Madison College of Letters and Science alumni
New York University School of Law alumni
People from Missoula, Montana
Democratic Socialists of America politicians from Montana
Democratic Party members of the Montana House of Representatives
Montana lawyers